The 2011 Korean FA Cup Final was a football match played on 15 October 2011 at Tancheon Sports Complex in Seongnam that decided the winner of the 2011 season of the Korean FA Cup. The 2011 final was the culmination of the 16th season of the tournament.

The final was contested by Seongnam Ilhwa Chunma and Suwon Samsung Bluewings, a repeat of the 2009 final held in Seongnam which Suwon won 1–1 (4–2) by penalty shootout. The match kicked off at 14:00 KST. The referee for the match was Kim Jong-Hyeok.

Road to the final

Seongnam Ilhwa Chunma

1Seongnam's goals always recorded first.

Suwon Samsung Bluewings

1Suwon's goals always recorded first.

Match details

References

2011
FA
Korean FA Cup Final 2011
Korean FA Cup Final 2011